Rodolfo Almeyda Morando (10 June 1923 – 12 July 2006) was an Argentine, naturalized Chilean, footballer who played as a midfielder or defender, usually in the position of centre-half. Almeyda played his early career in Argentina for Avellaneda Racing Club, and transferred to Chile in 1944. He initially won his fame playing for Universidad Católica, and later played for Unión Española and Palestino. He was part of the 1949 Universidad Católica team that won the Primera División de Chile and was also part of the 1955 Palestino team that won the Primera División de Chile.

In Argentina as well as the early years in Chile he played as a central midfielder, but later in his career, during his period in Palestino, he moved to the role of centre-back, and was known in particular for his technique and ability in the air. Following his nationalization, he played 22 games for Chile's national squad from 1954 to 1960. Famously he was part of the team that beat Brazil 4–1 during the 1956 South American Championship in Uruguay, helping his side to a second-place finish in the tournament.

Honours
Universidad Católica
 Primera División de Chile: 1949

Palestino
 Primera División de Chile: 1955

References

External links
 

1923 births
2006 deaths
Argentine emigrants to Chile
Argentine expatriate footballers
Argentine footballers
Naturalized citizens of Chile
Chilean footballers
Chile international footballers
Racing Club de Avellaneda footballers
Club Deportivo Palestino footballers
Unión Española footballers
Club Deportivo Universidad Católica footballers
Chilean Primera División players
Argentine Primera División players
Expatriate footballers in Chile
Argentine expatriate sportspeople in Chile
Association football defenders